Melito di Porto Salvo (or ) is a comune (municipality) in the Metropolitan City of Reggio Calabria in the Italian region Calabria, located about  southwest of Catanzaro and about  southeast of Reggio Calabria; and is also the southernmost municipality on the Italian Peninsula. It is part of the Bovesia Greek-speaking area of Calabria, occupying a hilly area which descends towards the Ionian Sea.

References

External links
 Official website
 Geosite of Pentedattilo - Southern Geologic Area
 Southern Geologic Area

Cities and towns in Calabria